Maigh Seóla, also known as Hy Briuin Seola, was the territory that included land along the east shore of Lough Corrib in County Galway, Ireland.  It was bounded to the east by the Uí Maine vassal kingdom of Soghain and extended roughly from what is now Clarinbridge in the south to Knockmaa Hill in the north. Its rulers belonged to the Uí Briúin Seóla and are sometimes found in the annals under the title "King of Uí Briúin" and "King of South Connacht".  The earliest identifiable kings belonged to the line that became the Clann Cosgraigh.  However in later times the line which would become the Muintir Murchada, under the O'Flaherty chiefs, monopolized the kingship. 

The Muintir Murchada were based at Loch Cime (later called Lough Hackett) until forced west of Lough Corrib during the de Burgo led English invasion of Connacht in the 13th century. According to the 17th-century historian Ruaidhrí Ó Flaithbheartaigh, Maigh Seóla was considered part of Iar Connacht prior to the 13th-century Anglo-Norman invasion of Connacht. After the de Burgo / Burke family became established in Maigh Seola the territorial term  was only used to denote the territory of the O'Flahertys west of Lough Corrib and Lough Mask. 

In English, the plain of Maigh Seóla is also known as Moyola.

Kings of Maigh Seóla

 Donn mac Cumasgach, died 752
 Connmhach Mór mac Coscraigh, died 846
 Maelan mac Cathmogha, died 848
 Murchadh mac Maenach, died 891
 Cléirchén mac Murchadh, died 908
 Urchadh mac Murchadh, died 943
 Donnchadh mac Urchadh, died 959
 Murchad mac Flann mac Glethneachan, died 973
 Ruaidhrí mac Coscraigh, died 992
 Maelcairearda, died 993
 Brian mac Maelruanaidh, died 1003 
 Muireadhach ua Flaithbheartach, died 1034
 Murchadh an Chapail Ua Flaithbheartaigh, died 1036
 Cathal mac Ruaidhri, died 1043
 Amhalgaidh mac Cathal, died 1075

Annalistic references

From the Annals of the Four Masters:

 M990.7 - The wind sunk the island of Loch Cimbe suddenly, with its dreach and rampart, i.e. thirty feet.

See also

 Crichaireacht cinedach nduchasa Muintiri Murchada
 Clann Fhergail
 Uí Fiachrach Aidhne
 Clann Taidg
 Conmhaícne
 Delbhna Tir Dha Locha
 Muintir Murchada
 Nevin (surname)
 Senchineoil
 Uí Maine
 Soghain
 Trícha Máenmaige
 Uí Díarmata
 Cóiced Ol nEchmacht
 Síol Anmchadha
 Iar Connacht
 Cenél Áeda na hEchtge

References

  A Chorographical Description of West or H-Iar Connaught written A.D. 1684 by Roderic O'Flaherty ESQ with notes and Illustrations by, James Hardiman M.R.I.A., Irish Archaeological Society, 1846.
 Medieval Ireland: Territorial, Political and Economic Divisions, Paul MacCotter, Four Courts Press, 2008, pp. 133–134. 

History of County Galway
Gaelic-Irish nations and dynasties
Connacht
Geography of County Galway
O'Flaherty dynasty